The 2020 OFC U-17 Women's Championship, originally to be held as the 2019 OFC U-16 Women's Championship, was originally to be the 5th edition of the OFC U-16/U-17 Women's Championship, the biennial international youth football championship organised by the Oceania Football Confederation (OFC) for the women's under-16/under-17 national teams of Oceania.

The 2019 OFC U-16 Women's Championship was originally scheduled to be held in New Zealand from 30 September to 12 October 2019. It was later rescheduled to be played in Tahiti from 7 to 20 December 2019. However, the OFC announced on 28 November 2019 that it would be postponed to 2020 due to the measles epidemic in the Pacific region. It was later rescheduled to 6 and 19 April 2020, with the name of the tournament changed from "2019 OFC U-16 Women's Championship" to "2020 OFC U-17 Women's Championship". However, on 9 March 2020, the OFC announced that all OFC tournaments were postponed until 6 May 2020 due to the COVID-19 pandemic. On 14 May 2020, it was announced that a further decision regarding that tournament would be made on 2 June 2020.

On 5 June 2020, the OFC announced that the tournament would be cancelled due to difficulty in rescheduling the tournament. New Zealand, who were the four-time defending champions, were nominated by the OFC Executive Committee as the OFC representatives for the 2021 FIFA U-17 Women's World Cup (originally 2020 but postponed due to COVID-19 pandemic) in India. However, FIFA announced on 17 November 2020 that this edition of the World Cup would be cancelled.

Teams
Nine of the 11 FIFA-affiliated national teams from OFC entered the tournament. There would be no qualification tournament, as it was suggested first.

Withdrew

Did not enter

Venue
The matches were originally to be played at the Stade Pater, Pirae.

Squads
Players born on or after 1 January 2003 were eligible to compete in the tournament.

Draw
The original draw of the tournament was held on 17 April 2019 at the OFC Academy in Auckland, New Zealand. The 10 teams were drawn into three groups, with Group A having four teams and Groups B and C having three teams. As the hosts were not known at the time of the draw, all teams were drawn into the group positions without any seeding, with the only restriction that the defending champions New Zealand must be drawn into Group A. The original draw results were:

Group A

Group B

Group C

However, after Papua New Guinea withdrew, a re-draw was held. The nine teams were drawn into three groups of three teams.

Group stage
The winners of each group and the runners-up of Group A would advance to the semi-finals.

All times are local, TAHT (UTC−10).

Group A

Group B

Group C

Knockout stage

Bracket

Semi-finals

Third place match

Final
Winner would have qualified for 2021 FIFA U-17 Women's World Cup.

Qualified teams for FIFA U-17 Women's World Cup
The following team from OFC, nominated by the OFC Executive Committee, would have qualified for the 2021 FIFA U-17 Women's World Cup before the tournament was cancelled.

1 Bold indicates champions for that year. Italic indicates hosts for that year.

References

External links
OFC U-17 Women's Championship 2020
News > OFC U-16 Women's Championship 2019 , oceaniafootball.com

2020
2020 FIFA U-17 Women's World Cup qualification
2020 in women's association football
2020 in youth association football
U-17 Women's Championship
2020 OFC U-17 Women's Championship
Association football events cancelled due to the COVID-19 pandemic